Rossitto is an Italian surname. Notable people with the surname include:

Angelo Rossitto (1908–1991), American actor and voice artist
Fabio Rossitto (born 1971), Italian footballer and manager
Steven Rossitto

See also
Rossetto (disambiguation)

Italian-language surnames